The discography of Supergrass, an English alternative rock band, consists of six studio albums, three extended plays, two compilation albums, 26 singles and 24 music videos. They were formed in 1993 by Gaz Coombes, Mick Quinn  and Danny Goffey. Rising to prominence during the Britpop era in the mid-1990s with their single "Alright", they were joined by Rob Coombes in 2002 (keyboards) until their demise on 11 June 2010.

The band released their first single "Caught by the Fuzz" on small independent record label, Backbeat records, on a limited run of 500. In October 1994 the single was re-released on the Parlophone label and reached number 43 in the UK Singles Chart, but failed to chart in the US. Supergrass released their debut full-length album I Should Coco in May 1995. The album reached number one in the UK Albums Chart and led to the band receiving four newcomer awards. The album's biggest hit single was "Alright" which reached number two in the UK Singles Chart. This is the joint highest chart position the band have gained for a single together with "Richard III" from their second album In It for the Money. This was the first album to be produced entirely by the band and peaked at number two in the UK Albums Chart. Their third self-titled album Supergrass, often referred to as "the X-ray" album due to the picture on the sleeve, peaked at number three in the UK Albums Chart. Their fourth album, Life On Other Planets was the first to include Rob Coombes as an official member of the band. The album peaked at number nine in the UK Albums Chart.

In 2004, the band released a singles compilation entitled Supergrass Is 10 to celebrate ten years since the band's formation. This is available on CD and DVD format. The DVD version features a documentary film, in which the band members recall moments during their career in the group. This also shows behind-the-scenes footage of recording sessions and live performances.

Fifth album, Road to Rouen, was recorded in Normandy, France, where the band created their own, purpose built, studio. Released in 2005, it peaked at number nine in the UK Albums Chart. First single St. Petersburg reached number 22 in the UK singles chart and featured a distinctive video directed by Borkur Sigthorsson.
Diamond Hoo Ha is the sixth album from the band. It peaked at number 19 in the UK Albums Chart, which made this release their lowest-charting album to date. The song "Diamond Hoo Ha Man" was first played live at Guilfest and this was recorded and made available as a free download via the band's website. 
"Rebel in You", from Diamond Hoo Ha, was released independently on Supergrass Records following their split from EMI, as a limited edition run of 1500, vinyl-only singles.

In 2017, Supergrass' back catalogue was bought by BMG from Warner Music, who then put it under The Echo Label, one of their artist catalogue companies, who released boxset The Strange Ones 1994 - 2008 in 2020 as the start of their re-issue campaign.

Albums

Studio albums

Live albums

Compilation albums

Extended plays

Notes
A ^ Released exclusively through iTunes.

Singles

Music videos

References

External links
 The Strange Ones Supergrass discography
 

Discography
Supergrass
Rock music group discographies